Henry Whitehead Mytton (16 September 1840 – 6 July 1890) was a New Zealand cricketer. He played in two first-class matches for Canterbury from 1863 to 1867.

References

External links
 

1840 births
1890 deaths
New Zealand cricketers
Canterbury cricketers